John Milligan is the name of:
John J. Milligan (1795–1875), American lawyer, judge and political figure
John Colborne Milligan (1867–1941), Ontario lawyer, judge and political figure
Jocko Milligan, born John Milligan (1861–1923), Major League Baseball player
John Milligan (baseball) (1904–1972), Major League Baseball player
John F. Milligan, CEO of Gilead Sciences
John Milligan-Whyte (born 1952), American businessman, lawyer and philosopher